Davy may refer to:
 Davy (given name)
 Davy (surname)
 Davy lamp, a type of safety lamp with its flame encased inside a mesh screen
 Davy, West Virginia, United States, a town
 Davy Sound, Greenland
 Davy (crater), a crater on the moon
 Davy (novel), a post-apocalyptic science fiction novel by Edgar Pangborn
 Davy (film), a 1957 British film produced by Basil Dearden
 Davy (album), a 2009 album by Coconut Records
 "Davy", a song by Janis Ian from the 1995 album Revenge
 Davy Stockbrokers, an Irish-based wealth manager

See also
 Devi (disambiguation)
 Davey (disambiguation)